Dancing Shoes may refer to:

 Dance shoes, footwear worn by dancers.
 Bernard "Dancing Shoes" Hartze, a retired South African footballer known for his deft footwork.
 Wintle's Wonders, a children's novel by Noel Streatfeild often referred to as Dancing Shoes.

Music 
 "Dancing Shoes",  1921 George and Ira Gershwin song they wrote for A Dangerous Maid
 "Dancing Shoes", a song by Cliff Richard from Summer Holiday (1963 film)
 "Dancing Shoes", a 1977 song by Dan Fogelberg from the album Nether Lands.
 "Dancin' Shoes", a 1978 song by Nigel Olsson
 "Dancing Shoes" (ja), a 1985 song by Seiko Matsuda.
 "Dancing Shoes", a 2012 song by Monika Brodka.
 "Dancing Shoes", a song by Arctic Monkeys from the album Whatever People Say I Am, That's What I'm Not  2006.
 "Dancing Shoes", a song by Dev from the album The Night the Sun Came Up.
 "Dancing Shoes", a song by Gavin DeGraw from Free (Gavin DeGraw album)
 Dancing Shoes, an album by Swedish singer September.